Louis John Chirban (August 26, 1930 – December 5, 2008) was a Greek American professional baseball player. He was one of the first five white players to join the Negro American League. He was signed to the Chicago American Giants in 1950 by Ted "Double Duty" Radcliffe with the support of the team’s owner, Dr. J. B. Martin, who was concerned about black players joining Major League teams.

See also 
 List of Negro league baseball players

References

Further reading 
 Jensen, Edward (March 24, 1949). "Good Material Boosts Wright Hopes in Track; Crane Molds Nine". Chicago Tribune. p. 84
 AP Wirephoto (July 12, 1950). "Now it's white players...". Green Bay Press-Gazette. p. 19

1930 births
2008 deaths
Baseball players from Illinois
Chicago American Giants players
American people of Greek descent